is a railway station in the city of Chita, Aichi, Japan, operated by Meitetsu.

Lines

Station layout
The station has dual opposed side platforms connected by an elevated station building located above then platforms and tracks. The station is unattended.

Platforms

Adjacent stations

Station history
Teramoto Station was opened on February 18, 1912 as a station on the Aichi Electric Railway Company. The Aichi Electric Railway became part of the Meitetsu group on August 1, 1935. The station building was reconstructed in March 1982. The station has been unattended since December 2004.

Passenger statistics
In fiscal 2017, the station was used by an average of 3,721 passengers daily (boarding passengers only).

Surrounding area
Chita Sports Park

See also
 List of Railway Stations in Japan

References

External links

 Official web page 

Railway stations in Japan opened in 1912
Railway stations in Aichi Prefecture
Stations of Nagoya Railroad
Chita, Aichi